= Playa Calamocarro =

Beach in Ceuta, Spain

Coordinates: 35.91178°N 5.35699°W

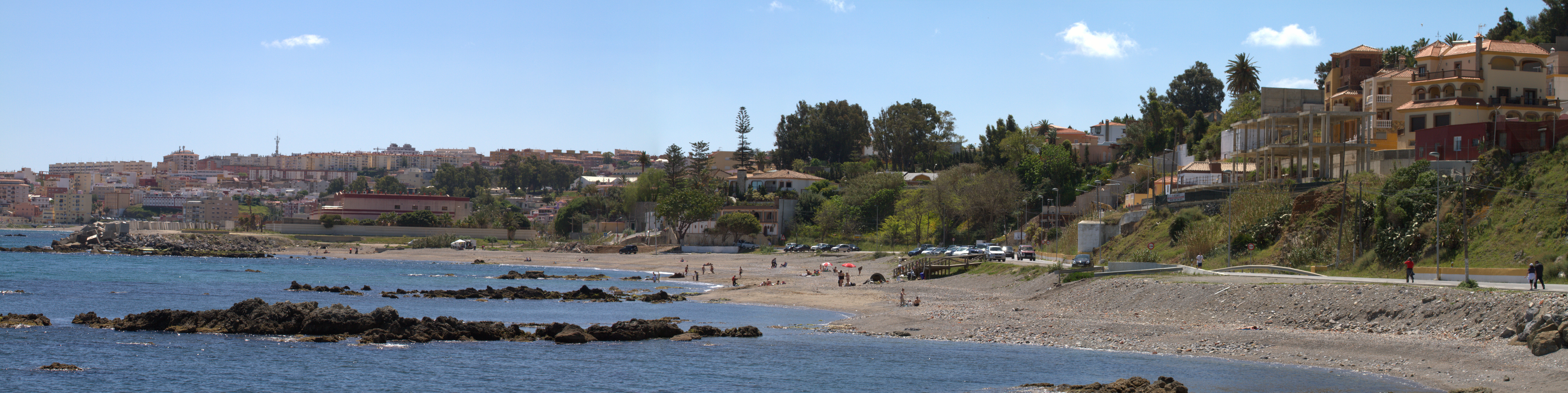
Playa Calamocarro

Playa Calamocarro is a beach of Ceuta, a Spanish city bordering northern Morocco. The beach is about 650 metres in length with an average width of about 15 metres. The area forms part of a protected ZEPA zone.
